One Day International (ODI) cricket is played between international cricket teams who are Full Members of the International Cricket Council (ICC) as well as the top four Associate members. Unlike Test matches, ODIs consist of one inning per team, having a limit in the number of overs, currently 50 overs per innings – although in the past this has been 55 or 60 overs. ODI cricket is List-A cricket, so statistics and records set in ODI matches also count toward List-A records. The earliest match recognised as an ODI was played between England and Australia in January 1971; since when there have been over 4,000 ODIs played by 28 teams. 
This is a list of New Zealand Cricket team's One Day International records. It is based on the List of One Day International cricket records, but concentrates solely on records dealing with the New Zealand cricket team. New Zealand played its first ever ODI in 1973.

Key
The top five records are listed for each category, except for the team wins, losses, draws and ties, all round records and the partnership records. Tied records for fifth place are also included. Explanations of the general symbols and cricketing terms used in the list are given below. Specific details are provided in each category where appropriate. All records include matches played for New Zealand only, and are correct .

Team records

Overall Record

Team wins, losses, draws and ties 
, New Zealand has played 794 ODI matches resulting in 366 victories, 379 defeats, 7 ties and 42 no results for an overall winning percentage of 46.09.

First bilateral ODI series wins

First ODI match wins

Winning every match in a series 
In a bilateral series winning all matches is referred to as whitewash. First such event occurred when West Indies toured England in 1976. New Zealand have recorded 15 such series victories.

Losing every match in a series 
New Zealand have also suffered such whitewash 16 times.

Team scoring records

Most runs in an innings
The highest innings total scored in ODIs came in the match between England and Australia in June 2018. Playing in the third ODI at Trent Bridge in Nottingham, the hosts posted a total of 481/6. The Only ODI against Ireland in July 2008 during 2008 tour of England saw New Zealand set their highest innings total of 402/2.

Fewest runs in an innings
The lowest innings total scored in ODIs has been scored twice. Zimbabwe were dismissed for 35 by Sri Lanka during the third ODI in Sri Lanka's tour of Zimbabwe in April 2004 and USA were dismissed for same score by Nepal in the sixth ODI of the 2020 ICC Cricket World League 2 in Nepal in February 2020. The lowest score in ODI history for New Zealand is 64 scored against Pakistan in the 1986 Austral-Asia Cup in Sharjah.

Most runs conceded an innings
The first match of the 2015 tour of England saw New Zealand concede their highest innings total of 408/9.

Fewest runs conceded in an innings
The lowest score conceded by New Zealand for a full inning is 69 scored by Kenya in the 2011 Cricket World Cup.

Most runs aggregate in a match
The highest match aggregate scored in ODIs came in the match between South Africa and Australia in the fifth ODI of March 2006 series at Wanderers Stadium, Johannesburg when South Africa scored 438/9 in response to Australia's 434/4. The 2nd ODI of the series against England at The Oval, London saw a total of 763 runs being scored, which is the most involving New Zeaaland.

Fewest runs aggregate in a match
The lowest match aggregate in ODIs is 71 when USA were dismissed for 35 by Nepal in the sixth ODI of the 2020 ICC Cricket World League 2 in Nepal in February 2020. The lowest match aggregate in ODI history for New Zealand is 106 scored in the second match of the 1985 tour of West Indies.

Result records
An ODI match is won when one side has scored more runs than the total runs scored by the opposing side during their innings. If both sides have completed both their allocated innings and the side that fielded last has the higher aggregate of runs, it is known as a win by runs. This indicates the number of runs that they had scored more than the opposing side. If the side batting last wins the match, it is known as a win by wickets, indicating the number of wickets that were still to fall.

Greatest win margins (by runs)
The greatest winning margin by runs in ODIs was New Zealand's victory over Ireland by 290 runs in the only ODI of the 2008 England tour.

Greatest win margins (by balls remaining)
The greatest winning margin by balls remaining in ODIs was England's victory over Canada by 8 wickets with 277 balls remaining in the 1979 Cricket World Cup. The largest victory recorded by New Zealand is during the Bangladesh's tour in 2007 when they won by 10 wickets with 264 balls remaining.

Greatest win margins (by wickets)
A total of 55 matches have ended with chasing team winning by 10 wickets with West Indies winning by such margins a record 10 times. New Zealand have won an ODI match by this margin on nine occasions.

Highest successful run chases
South Africa holds the record for the highest successful run chase which they achieved when they scored 438/9 in response to Australia's 434/9. New Zealand's highest innings total while chasing is 322/3 in a successful run chase against West Indies at Taunton, England during the 2019 Cricket World Cup.

Narrowest win margins (by runs)
The narrowest run margin victory is by 1 run which has been achieved in 31 ODI's with New Zealand winning such games a four times.

Narrowest win margins (by balls remaining)
The narrowest winning margin by balls remaining in ODIs is by winning of the last ball which has been achieved 36 times with New Zealand winning five times.

Narrowest win margins (by wickets)
The narrowest margin of victory by wickets is 1 wicket which has settled 55 such ODIs. New Zealand have recorded such victory on nine occasions.

Greatest loss margins (by runs)
New Zealand's biggest defeat by runs was against Australia in the 2007 Cricket World Cup at National Cricket Stadium, St. George's, Grenada.

Greatest loss margins (by balls remaining)
The greatest winning margin by balls remaining in ODIs was England's victory over Canada by 8 wickets with 277 balls remaining in the 1979 Cricket World Cup. The largest defeat suffered by New Zealand was against New Zealand in New Zealand when they lost by 10 wickets with 264 balls remaining.

Greatest loss margins (by wickets)
New Zealand have lost an ODI match by a margin of 10 wickets on three occasions with most recent being during the fourth match of the West Indies tour of New Zealand in March 1987.

Narrowest loss margins (by runs)
The narrowest loss of New Zealand in terms of runs is by 1 run suffered thrice.

Narrowest loss margins (by balls remaining)
The narrowest winning margin by balls remaining in ODIs is by winning of the last ball which has been achieved 36 times with both South Africa winning seven times. New Zealand has suffered loss by this margin six times.

Narrowest loss margins (by wickets)
New Zealand has suffered defeat by 1 wicket on seven occasions.

Tied matches 
A tie can occur when the scores of both teams are equal at the conclusion of play, provided that the side batting last has completed their innings. 
There have been 37 ties in ODIs history with New Zealand involved in seven such games.

Individual records

Batting records

Most career runs
A run is the basic means of scoring in cricket.
India's Sachin Tendulkar has scored the most runs in ODIs with 18,246. Second is Kumar Sangakkara of Sri Lanka with 14,234 ahead of Ricky Ponting from Australia in third with 13,704. Ross Taylor is the leading New Zealand on this list.

Fastest runs getter

Most runs in each batting position

Most runs against each team

Highest individual score
Martin Guptill holds the New Zealand record, scoring 237* in the fourth quarter-final of the 2015 Cricket World Cup against West Indies.

Highest individual score – progression of record

Most individual score in each batting position

Highest score against each opponent

Highest career average
A batsman's batting average is the total number of runs they have scored divided by the number of times they have been dismissed.

Highest Average in each batting position

Most half-centuries
A half-century is a score of between 50 and 99 runs. Statistically, once a batsman's score reaches 100, it is no longer considered a half-century but a century.

Sachin Tendulkar of India has scored the most half-centuries in ODIs with 96. He is followed by the Sri Lanka's Kumar Sangakkara on 93, South Africa's Jacques Kallis on 86 and India's Rahul Dravid and Pakistan's Inzamam-ul-Haq on 83.Ross Taylor is the leading New Zealander in this list with 51 half-centuries.

Most centuries
A century is a score of 100 or more runs in a single innings.

Tendulkar has also scored the most centuries in ODIs with 49. New Zealand's Ross Taylor has the most centuries for New Zealand.

Most Sixes

Most Fours

Highest strike rates
Andre Russell of West Indies holds the record for highest strike rate, with minimum 500 balls faced qualification, with 130.22. Luke Ronchi, one of 14 men to have played ODIs for two national teams is the New Zealand batsmen with the highest strike rate.

Highest strike rates in an inning
James Franklin of New Zealand's strike rate of 387.50 during his 31* off 8 balls against Canada during 2011 Cricket World Cup is the world record for highest strike rate in an innings.

Most runs in a calendar year
Tendulkar holds the record for most runs scored in a calendar year with 1894 runs scored in 1998. Guptill scored 1489 runs in 2015, the most for a New Zealand batsmen in a year.

Most runs in a series
The 1980-81 Benson & Hedges World Series Cup in Australia saw Greg Chappell set the record for the most runs scored in a single series scoring 685 runs. He is followed by Sachin Tendulkar with 673 runs scored in the 2003 Cricket World Cup. Kane Williamson has scored the most runs in a series for a New Zealand batsmen, when he scored 578 runs in the 2019 Cricket World Cup.

Most ducks
A duck refers to a batsman being dismissed without scoring a run. 
Sanath Jayasuriya has scored the equal highest number of ducks in ODIs with 34 such knocks. Daniel Vettori, the 100th New Zealand ODI player, hold this dubious record for New Zealand with 22 ducks (23 in total including one for ICC World XI during the 2005 ICC Super Series).

Bowling records

Most career wickets 
A bowler takes the wicket of a batsman when the form of dismissal is bowled, caught, leg before wicket, stumped or hit wicket. If the batsman is dismissed by run out, obstructing the field, handling the ball, hitting the ball twice or timed out the bowler does not receive credit.

New Zealand's Daniel Vettori with 297 wickets has taken the most wickets for his team in ODIs. He lies in the 13th position in the overall list of leading ODI wicket-takers.

Fastest wicket taker

Most career wickets against each team

Best figures in an innings 
Bowling figures refers to the number of the wickets a bowler has taken and the number of runs conceded.
Sri Lanka's Chaminda Vaas holds the world record for best figures in an innings when he took 8/19 against Zimbabwe in December 2001 at Colombo (SSC). Tim Southee holds the New Zealand record for best bowling figures when he took 7/33 against England during the 2015 Cricket World Cup.

Best figures in an innings – progression of record

Best Bowling Figure against each opponent

Best career average 
A bowler's bowling average is the total number of runs they have conceded divided by the number of wickets they have taken.
Afghanistan's Rashid Khan holds the record for the best career average in ODIs with 18.54. Joel Garner, West New Zealand cricketer, and a member of the highly regarded late 1970s and early 1980s West Indies cricket teams, is second behind Rashid with an overall career average of 18.84 runs per wicket. Shane Bond is the highest ranked New Zealand when the qualification of 2000 balls bowled is followed.

Best career economy rate 
A bowler's economy rate is the total number of runs they have conceded divided by the number of overs they have bowled.
West Indies' Joel Garner, holds the ODI record for the best career economy rate with 3.09. New Zealand's Richard Hadlee, with a rate of 3.30 runs per over conceded over his 115-match ODI career, has the fifth best economy rate among all the bowlers.

Best career strike rate 
A bowler's strike rate is the total number of balls they have bowled divided by the number of wickets they have taken.
The top bowler with the best ODI career strike rate is South Africa's Lungi Ngidi with strike rate of 23.2 balls per wicket. New Zealand's Mitchell McClenaghan is the highest ranked New Zealand in this list when a qualification of 2000 balls is applied.

Most four-wickets (& over) hauls in an innings 
Trent Boult is joint-15th on the list of most four-wicket hauls with Pakistan's Waqar Younis, Sri Lanka's Muttiah Muralitharan and Australia's Brett Lee leading this list in ODIs.

Most five-wicket hauls in a match 
A five-wicket haul refers to a bowler taking five wickets in a single innings.
Trent Boult and Richard Hadlee, with five hauls, are the highest ranked New Zealand on the list of most five-wicket hauls which is headed by Pakistan's Waqar Younis with 13 such hauls.

Best economy rates in an inning 
The best economy rate in an inning, when a minimum of 30 balls are delivered by the player, is West Indies player Phil Simmons economy of 0.30 during his spell of 3 runs for 4 wickets in 10 overs against Pakistan at Sydney Cricket Ground in the 1991-92 Australian Tri-Series. Ewen Chatfield holds the New Zealand record during his spell in first ODI against Sri Lanka at Carisbrook, Dunedin.

Best strike rates in an inning 
The best strike rate in an inning, when a minimum of 4 wickets are taken by the player, is shared by Sunil Dhaniram of Canada, Paul Collingwood of England and Virender Sehwag of India when they achieved a strike rate of 4.2 balls pr wicket. Chris Harris during his spell of 4/7 achieved the best strike rate for a New Zealand bowler.

Worst figures in an innings 
The worst figures in an ODI came in the 5th One Day International between South Africa at home to Australia in 2006. Australia's Mick Lewis returned figures of 0/113 from his 10 overs in the second innings of the match. The worst figures by a New Zealand is 0/105 that came off the bowling of Tim Southee in the third game against India at Christchurch in March 2009.

Most runs conceded in a match 
Mick Lewis also holds the dubious distinction of most runs conceded in an ODI during the aforementioned match. The top two New Zealand record in ODIs are held by Tim Southee and Martin Snedden.

Most wickets in a calendar year 
Pakistan's Saqlain Mushtaq holds the record for most wickets taken in a year when he took 69 wickets in 1997 in 36 ODIs. Chris Pringle is the highest New Zealand on the list having taken 46 wickets in 1994.

Most wickets in a series 
1998–99 Carlton and United Series involving Australia, England and Sri Lanka and the 2019 Cricket World Cup saw the records set for the most wickets taken by a bowler in an ODI series when Australian pacemen Glenn McGrath and Mitchell Starc achieved a total of 27 wickets during the series, respectively. New Zealand's Trent Boult is joint 10th with his 22 wickets taken during the 2019 Cricket World Cup.

Hat-trick 
In cricket, a hat-trick occurs when a bowler takes three wickets with consecutive deliveries. The deliveries may be interrupted by an over bowled by another bowler from the other end of the pitch or the other team's innings, but must be three consecutive deliveries by the individual bowler in the same match. Only wickets attributed to the bowler count towards a hat-trick; run outs do not count.
In ODIs history there have been just 49 hat-tricks, the first achieved by Jalal-ud-Din for Pakistan against Australia in 1982.

Wicket-keeping records
The wicket-keeper is a specialist fielder who stands behind the stumps being guarded by the batsman on strike and is the only member of the fielding side allowed to wear gloves and leg pads.

Most career dismissals 
A wicket-keeper can be credited with the dismissal of a batsman in two ways, caught or stumped. A fair catch is taken when the ball is caught fully within the field of play without it bouncing after the ball has touched the striker's bat or glove holding the bat, Laws 5.6.2.2 and 5.6.2.3 state that the hand or the glove holding the bat shall be regarded as the ball striking or touching the bat while a stumping occurs when the wicket-keeper puts down the wicket while the batsman is out of his ground and not attempting a run.
New Zealand's Brendon McCullum is sixth in taking most dismissals in ODIs as a designated wicket-keeper with Sri Lanka's Kumar Sangakkara and Australian Adam Gilchrist heading the list.

Most career catches 
McCullum is 5th in taking most catches in ODIs as a designated wicket-keeper.

Most career stumpings 
Dhoni holds the record for the most stumpings in ODIs with 123 followed by Sri Lankans Sangakkara and Romesh Kaluwitharana.

Most dismissals in an innings 
Ten wicket-keepers on 15 occasions have taken six dismissals in a single innings in an ODI. Adam Gilchrist of Australia alone has done it six times.

The feat of taking 5 dismissals in an innings has been achieved by 49 wicket-keepers on 87 occasions including four New Zealanders.

Most dismissals in a series 
Gilchrist also holds the ODIs record for the most dismissals taken by a wicket-keeper in a series. He made 27 dismissals during the 1998-99 Carlton & United Series. New Zealand record is held by Tom Latham when he made 21 dismissals during the 2019 Cricket World Cup.

Fielding records

Most career catches 
Caught is one of the nine methods a batsman can be dismissed in cricket. The majority of catches are caught in the slips, located behind the batsman, next to the wicket-keeper, on the off side of the field. Most slip fielders are top order batsmen.

Sri Lanka's Mahela Jayawardene holds the record for the most catches in ODIs by a non-wicket-keeper with 218, followed by Ricky Ponting of Australia on 160 and New Zealand Mohammad Azharuddin with 156.Ross Taylor is the leading catcher for New Zealand.

Most catches in an innings 
South Africa's Jonty Rhodes is the only fielder to have taken five catches in an innings.

The feat of taking 4 catches in an innings has been achieved by 42 fielders on 44 occasions including seven New Zealand fielders.

Most catches in a series 
The 2019 Cricket World Cup, which was won by England for the first time, saw the record set for the most catches taken by a non-wicket-keeper in an ODI series. Englishman batsman and captain of the England Test team Joe Root took 13 catches in the series as well as scored 556 runs. Jeremy Coney with 11 catches in 1980-81 Benson & Hedges World Series is the leading New Zealand on this list.

All-round Records

1000 runs and 100 wickets 
A total of 64 players have achieved the double of 1000 runs and 100 wickets in their ODI career.

250 runs and 5 wickets in a series 
A total of 50 players on 103 occasions have achieved the double of 250 runs and 5 wickets in a series.

Other records

Most career matches 
India's Sachin Tendulkar holds the record for the most ODI matches played with 463, with former captains Mahela Jayawardene and Sanath Jayasuriya being second and third having represented Sri Lanka on 443 and 441 occasions, respectively. Former New Zealand skippers Daniel Vettori and Stpehen Fleming are top two most experienced New Zealand plpayers having represented their national teams on 291 and 279 occasions, respectively.

Most consecutive career matches 
Tendulkar also holds the record for the most consecutive ODI matches played with 185. He broke Richie Richardson's long standing record of 132 matches.

Most matches as captain 

Ricky Ponting, who led the Australian cricket team from 2002 to 2012, holds the record for the most matches played as captain in ODIs with 230 (including 1 as captain of ICC World XI team).Stephen Fleming has led New Zealand in 218 matches, second highest behind Ponting.

Most man of the match awards

Most man of the series awards

Youngest players on Debut 

The youngest player to play in an ODI match is claimed to be Hasan Raza at the age of 14 years and 233 days. Making his debut for Sri Lanka against Zimbabwe on 30 October 1996, there is some doubt as to the validity of Raza's age at the time.

Oldest players on Debut 
The Netherlands batsmen Nolan Clarke is the oldest debutant to appear in an ODI match. Playing in the 1996 Cricket World Cup against New Zealand in 1996 at Reliance Stadium in Vadodara, India he was aged 47 years and 240 days.

Oldest players 
The Netherlands batsmen Nolan Clarke is the oldest player to appear in an ODI match. Playing in the 1996 Cricket World Cup against South Africa in 1996 at Rawalpindi Cricket Stadium in Rawalpindi, Pakistan he was aged 47 years and 257 days.

Partnership records
In cricket, two batsmen are always present at the crease batting together in a partnership. This partnership will continue until one of them is dismissed, retires or the innings comes to a close.

Highest partnerships by wicket
A wicket partnership describes the number of runs scored before each wicket falls. The first wicket partnership is between the opening batsmen and continues until the first wicket falls. The second wicket partnership then commences between the not out batsman and the number three batsman. This partnership continues until the second wicket falls. The third wicket partnership then commences between the not out batsman and the new batsman. This continues down to the tenth wicket partnership. When the tenth wicket has fallen, there is no batsman left to partner so the innings is closed.

Highest partnerships by runs
The highest ODI partnership by runs for any wicket is held by the West Indian pairing of Chris Gayle and Marlon Samuels who put together a second wicket partnership of 372 runs during the 2015 Cricket World Cup against Zimbabwe in February 2015. This broke the record of 331 runs set by Indian pair of Sachin Tendulkar and Rahul Dravid against New Zealand in 1999

Highest overall partnership runs by a pair

Umpiring records

Most matches umpired
An umpire in cricket is a person who officiates the match according to the Laws of Cricket. Two umpires adjudicate the match on the field, whilst a third umpire has access to video replays, and a fourth umpire looks after the match balls and other duties. The records below are only for on-field umpires.

Rudi Koertzen of South Africa holds the record for the most ODI matches umpired with 209. The current active Aleem Dar is currently at 208 matches. They are followed by New Zealand's Billy Bowden who officiated in 200 matches.

See also

List of New Zealand Women's One Day International cricket records
List of One Day International cricket records
List of One Day International cricket hat-tricks
List of New Zealand Test cricket records
List of New Zealand Twenty20 International cricket records
List of Cricket World Cup records

Notes

References

One Day International cricket records
New Zealand cricket lists